Family Affair is a television comedy that aired on The WB from September 12, 2002 to March 13, 2003. It was a remake of the original 1966 television series. This version was from Sid and Marty Krofft, and was produced by Sid & Marty Krofft Pictures, Pariah Films, and Turner Television. The WB canceled the series after airing thirteen of the fifteen episodes produced.

Cast
 Tim Curry as Mr. Giles French 
 Caitlin Wachs as Sigourney "Cissy" Davis 
 Sasha Pieterse as Elizabeth "Buffy" Davis
 Luke Benward (pilot) and Jimmy "Jax" Pinchak (episodes 2–15) as Jonathan "Jody" Davis
 Gary Cole as William Lloyd "Uncle Bill" Davis

Kathy Garver and Johnny Whitaker from the original series guest starred as Beverly and Kevin in the Christmas episode, "Holiday Fever".

Production
The series was created as a remake of the original 1966–1971 Family Affair television series. It was produced by Pariah Films and Turner Television, with Bob Young, Gavin Polone, Sid and Marty Krofft, and Randy Pope acting as the series' executive producers. It was filmed in the same CBS Studio City lot as the original series.

It was picked up to series by The WB in May 2002, when it was announced that the series would anchor a new Thursday night comedy block for the network. Luke Benward originally played the role of Jody in the series pilot, but was replaced by Jimmy "Jax" Pinchak as Jody in subsequent episodes.

Family Affair earned a full season, when The WB gave the series a back-nine episode order in October 2002, but suffered low viewership soon after. In November 2002, The WB reversed course and cut the episode order for Family Affair by three episodes, and then soon after changed the episode order to just two additional episodes, for a total production order of 15 episodes rather than 22 or 19. The series was then pulled from the air in December 2002 due to low ratings.

The series returned with new episodes in late February 2003, airing after Sabrina the Teenage Witch. By late March 2003, Family Affair was again pulled from the air and was generally considered to be "done". The WB officially passed on a second season of the series in May 2003.

Episodes

Reception

Critical 
Variety critic Michael Speier reviewed the series premiere of Family Affair negatively, describing it as "a dog of a debut", adding that it "wreaks of manufactured happiness and warm-and-fuzzy plotlines", though Speier praised production designer Scott Heineman for the set design.

Ratings 
The one-hour pilot garnered high ratings for The WB, drawing 4.55 million viewers for its one-hour series premiere. The second episode "held up reasonably well", drawing 3.38 million viewers for its airing. But subsequent episodes declined against competition on Thursdays, and by December 2002 Variety stated that the series "barely register[s] on Nielsen’s charts". For the season, Family Affair ranked 148th out of 159 U.S. broadcast network series (155th in the 18–49 demographic), averaging 2.6 million viewers.

References

External links 
 
 

2000s American sitcoms
2002 American television series debuts
2003 American television series endings
English-language television shows
Television series about families
Television series reboots
Television shows set in New York City
The WB original programming
Television series by Warner Bros. Television Studios